Lee Chang-ho (born 1 May 1969) is a South Korean former para table tennis player. He won a bronze medal at the 2012 Summer Paralympics. He was coached by Choi Kyoung-sik.

He injured his spinal cord during a car accident in 1996.

References

1969 births
Living people
Table tennis players at the 2012 Summer Paralympics
Table tennis players at the 2016 Summer Paralympics
Medalists at the 2012 Summer Paralympics
South Korean male table tennis players
Paralympic bronze medalists for South Korea
Paralympic table tennis players of South Korea
Paralympic medalists in table tennis
Sportspeople from Daegu
People with paraplegia